François Vatel (1631 – 24 April 1671) was the majordomo (in French) of Nicolas Fouquet and prince Louis II de Bourbon-Condé.

Vatel was born either in Switzerland or in Paris in 1625, 1631, or 1635. He is widely credited with creating crème Chantilly (Chantilly cream), a sweet, vanilla-flavoured whipped cream, but there is no contemporary documentation for this claim, and whipped, flavored cream was known at least a century earlier.

Vatel served Louis XIV's superintendent Nicolas Fouquet in the inauguration  at the Château de Vaux-le-Vicomte that took place on 17 August 1661.

Vatel was responsible for an extravagant banquet for 2,000 people hosted in honour of Louis XIV by the Grand Condé in April 1671 at the Château de Chantilly, where he died. According to a letter by Madame de Sévigné, Vatel was so distraught about the lateness of the seafood delivery and about other mishaps that he committed suicide by running himself through with his sword, and his body was discovered when someone came to tell him of the arrival of the fish. 

This incident is thought to be the origin of the idiom "died for want of lobster sauce", a phrase meaning to die or be devastated due to a minor disappointment or mishap.

Popular culture
Vatel was depicted in the 2000 film  Vatel by Roland Joffé, with Gérard Depardieu playing the titular role. According to the film, Vatel committed suicide when he realized he was nothing more than property in the eyes of the nobility, his social superiors.

References

Further reading
 Dominique Michel 1999.Vatel ou la naissance de la gastronomie (Editions Fayard)
 Patrick Rambourg 1999. Recettes du Grand Siècle (Editions Fayard)
 Mathilde Mottoule 2006. Vatel ou l'origine d'un mythe.

1631 births
1671 deaths
Chefs from Paris
Suicides by sharp instrument in France
17th-century suicides